A Princesa Xuxa e os Trapalhões is a 1989 Brazilian adventure film, directed by José Alvarenga Jr and starring Xuxa Meneghel and Os Trapalhões.

Plot 
On the planet Antar in the right arm of the Milky Way, the evil Ratan usurps the throne after the emperor dies. Using all the kingdom's military power, he forces children into slave labor. Princess Xaron, who is trapped inside the palace and unaware of what is happening outside, thinks the people are happy. Three princes, Zacaling, Mussaim, and Dedeon, join forces with the "Nameless Knight" to defeat Ratan and free the children.

Reception

Commercial
Matheus Bonez in his criticism of the website Papo de Cinema wrote, "Production may not be a thing of the past, but it does not have to be negative about it. Even the 'performances' of the cast, in general, do not compromise fun more than guaranteed. (...) A legitimate afternoon session without commitment."

Box office
It had 4.3 million spectators in the cinema. It was marketed to Portugal in 1990.

Cast 
Renato Aragão .... Diron, or the Nameless Knight
Mussum .... Mussaim
Dedé Santana .... Dedeon
Zacarias .... Zacaling
Xuxa Meneghel .... Princess Xaron
Paulo Reis .... Emperor Ratan
Trem da Alegria .... slave children

See also 
 List of Brazilian films of the 1980s

References

External links 
 

Os Trapalhões
Brazilian adventure films
Brazilian children's films
1989 films
Brazilian romantic comedy films
1980s musical comedy films
1989 comedy films
1989 adventure films
1989 children's films
Brazilian science fiction films
1989 science fiction films
Films based on fairy tales